Saunders Secondary School is located at 941 Viscount Road in the Westmount suburb of London, Ontario, Canada. It is named after William Saunders. William Saunders was a Canadian pioneer and an authority on  agriculture and horticulture. Grades offered are 9–12. Saunders' school colours are red and gold and its mascot is a sabre-tooth tiger.  Saunders Secondary School is the largest high school in the Thames Valley District School Board with close to 2000 students and 120 teachers.  As of 2008, Saunders is also the site of new credit summer school for the TVDSB.

History 
Classes for Saunders began in portables at Westminster S.S. in 1970. Construction of Saunders was completed in 1972. The school cost more than $8 million to build.  The location caused many heated debates. The people of Byron, Ontario had been promised, upon amalgamation with the city of London, Ontario, a secondary school in their area so that their children would not have to be bused to the Westmount area. The chosen site for the multimillion-dollar school – right in the heart of the Westmount area, across the street from the Westmount Mall – greatly angered the Byron Area Secondary School Association. In spite of this, in January 1969, the London Board of Education approved the Westmount location for the school.

On April 18, 1994, arsonists set fire to Saunders forcing the evacuation and temporary closure of the school, as well as an extensive rebuilding of the rear part of the building.  London Police subsequently charged three students with setting the blaze.

Saunders recently underwent an exterior renovation, the first new construction at the school in over three decades.  A new entryway was added on the north-east corner of the building along with the fire escape stairs at the south and on the north-west corner of the school, contrasting modern with brutalist architecture.

Tech programs 
Current tech programs include: photography, broadcasting, electrical, computer engineering (offering CCNA & A+ certifications), woodworking, automotive, autobody, drafting graphic design, machine shop, welding and a newly added art welding course.

Saunders also offers courses in science, physical education, family studies, business and administration, computer programming, and others.

Musical theatre 
Saunders is one of the only schools in the TVDSB that offers the musical theatre performance course, another being H.B. Beal. One difference between the two schools' programs is the rotation. While Beal takes a 2 show-break schedule, Saunders does a big show on the main stage, and then a smaller show in the drama studio, alternating each year. The shows that have been performed are:
Little Shop of Horrors
Godspell
Snow White
Chicago
Groovy
Bye Bye Birdie
The Wedding Singer
The 25th Annual Putnam County Spelling Bee
Annie
The Wizard of Oz
Grease
 Fame

Sports 
The senior boys' volleyball team won both TVRAA and OFSAA in AAAA for the fourth straight year in 2007, the only team in Ontario history to accomplish this feat. Saunders is considered one of the best volleyball high schools in Canada, having many of the provinces' elite young players.

The Saunders junior football team won the city championships in 2007 for the first time in ten years.
Saunders Varsity Wrestling team won team championship for the second time in a row (2014–15)and (2020-2021). Boys TVRAA and OFSAA Champions. Also the Boys 3rd overall at OFSAA in 2016 and 7th overall as a school in 2020. Currently the school is developing athletes and training their students in Health and Safety so that they can take over the Regional Championship in order to build the best OFSSA Team that they can.

Notable alumni and staff 

 Josh Anderson (ice hockey), NHL player Columbus Blue Jackets
 Miranda Ayim, basketball player, Canadian Women's Team, WNBA (2011–present)
 George Dvorsky, futurist, ethicist, and contributing editor at io9
 Remi Elie, OHL player Erie Otters Drafted in 2nd round by the Dallas Stars
 Tyler Hemming, professional soccer player
 Dane Fox, ECHL player Kalamazoo Wings Prospect of the Vancouver Canucks
 George Georgallidis, co-founder of eSports team Counter Logic Gaming
 Stuart Hughes, stage and screen actor and founding member of Soulpepper
 Patrick Kane, NHL player, 3-time Stanley Cup champion with the Chicago Blackhawks
 Chris Kelly, NHL player Ottawa Senators and 2011 Stanley Cup Champion
 Adam Kreek, Canadian athlete and Olympian
 Irene Mathyssen, federal Member of Parliament and former Ontario Cabinet Minister was an English teacher at Saunders
 Jay McNeil, former CFL player
 Corey Perry, NHL player
 Rob Ramage, former NHL player, Stanley Cup champion with the Calgary Flames and Montreal Canadiens
 Jude St. John, former CFL player, teaches at Saunders
 Tim Tindale, NFL player
 Kittie
 Craig Brown Actor,Producer, Writer
 Stephanie Jacob-Goldman Producer of HBO Max Station Eleven

See also
List of high schools in Ontario

References

External links 

 Saunders Secondary School
 Thames Valley District School Board
 Class of 1982 Reunion

High schools in London, Ontario
Educational institutions established in 1972
1972 establishments in Ontario